Mancunian is the associated adjective and demonym of Manchester, a city in North West England. It may refer to:

Anything from or related to the city of Manchester or the county of Greater Manchester, in particular:
The people of Manchester (see also List of people from Manchester)
The Manchester dialect of English
The Mancunion, a student newspaper published by University of Manchester Students' Union.
Buses created primarily to the specifications of Manchester Corporation's transport department:
The Crossley Mancunian front-engine double-decker chassis of the 1930s
The rear-engine double-decker bodywork on Leyland and Daimler chassis of the 1960s

See also
Mancunian Films
Mancunian Way
Mancunians RL, a rugby league and handball club
Mancunian music
758 Mancunia, a minor planet

Language and nationality disambiguation pages